Adrian Neil Adams,  (born 27 September 1958 in Rugby, Warwickshire) is an English judoka who won numerous Olympic and World Championship medals in judo representing Great Britain. He was appointed Member of the Order of the British Empire (MBE) in the 1983 New Year Honours for services to judo.

Early life
Adams was educated at Myton School in Warwick. Adams' brother was the late professional wrestling star Chris Adams, who himself had a successful career in judo before turning to pro wrestling in 1978.

Judo competition career
Adams was the first British male to win a World title, and the first British male to simultaneously hold a world title and a European title. Other achievements include a gold medal at the 1981 World Judo Championships in Maastricht, the Netherlands, plus silver medals in the 1980 and 1984 Summer Olympic Games and the 1983 Judo World Championships. Adams was also five-time European Champion. He is also a two times champion of Great Britain, winning lightweight and half-middleweight divisions at the British Judo Championships in 1976 and 1988.

On 18 December 2018 he was promoted by the International Judo Federation to kudan - 9th Dan at the age of 60. He was presented with his certificate of grade (at the Paris Grand Slam tournament) on 10 February 2019 by the federation's president, Marius Vizer.

Coaching career
Since retiring, Adams has run a coach education business called Neil Adams Effective Fighting, as well as teaching Judo around the world.

He was national coach of VJF judo in Belgium. He then became head coach of the Welsh Judo Association, a position he took on after being asked to take up the role by close friend and chairman of the association Keven Williams, a position he resigned in March 2009.

Personal life
In the 1980s Adams was engaged to British Olympic swimming star Sharron Davies. 

Adams married Alison Walker of Burford, and together had a son but they divorced in 2000.

He met former Canadian Olympic Judoka Niki Jenkins at the Sydney Olympic Games and were married in 2002. The couple have two daughters, Brooke and Taylor, and live in Rugby.

Bibliography
 (1986) "Olympic Judo: Throwing Techniques" Pelham (with Cyril Carter)
 (1986) "Olympic Judo: Variations on Groundwork" Pelham (with Cyril Carter)
 (1988) "Olympic Judo: Preparation and Training" Pelham (with Cyril Carter)
 (1991) "Tai-otoshi" Judo Masterclass Techniques Ippon Books
 (1991) "Arm Locks" Judo Masterclass Techniques Ippon Books
 (1991) "Grips" Judo Masterclass Techniques Ippon Books
 (2016) "A Game of Throws – celebrating 50 years in Judo" Fox Spirit Books

In popular culture
Adams was so fondly regarded in Japan that he was given the nickname Happo Bigin (Everyone's friend).

A canine version of Neil Adams made a 'guest appearance' in episode 44 of the online comic series Dog Judo

On 2 December 1983, he was one of the guests on the U.K. children's programme Crackerjack together with Lynsey de Paul and Kim Wilde.

Adams was also a contestant on the BBC TV series The Adventure Game in 1983

He is now a commentator for the IJF.

See also
 Judo in the United Kingdom

References

External links

 
 
 
 
 Neil Adams at RealJudo.net (archived)
 Neil Adams Corporate Health (archived)
 Video: Judo Maastricht 1981: Neil Adams (GBR) – Jiro Kase (JPN)
 1984 Los Angeles Summer Games Judo Event Magazine

1958 births
Living people
English male judoka
Olympic judoka of Great Britain
Judoka at the 1980 Summer Olympics
Judoka at the 1984 Summer Olympics
Judoka at the 1988 Summer Olympics
English Olympic medallists
Olympic silver medallists for Great Britain
Members of the Order of the British Empire
Olympic medalists in judo
Sportspeople from Rugby, Warwickshire
Medalists at the 1984 Summer Olympics
Medalists at the 1980 Summer Olympics